Mass for Shut-Ins is a Canadian drama film, directed by Winston DeGiobbi and released in 2017. The film stars Charles William McKenzie as Kay Jay, an aimless slacker living with his grandfather Loppers (Joey Lee Maclean) in New Waterford, Nova Scotia and navigating his fraught relationship with his delinquent older brother September (Stephen Melanson).

The film premiered at the 2017 Vancouver International Film Festival. It screened alongside There Lived the Colliers, a short film by Nelson MacDonald documenting abandoned housing in Cape Breton Island.

It was shortlisted for the Directors Guild of Canada's DGC Discovery Award, and for the Vancouver Film Critics Circle's One to Watch award at the Vancouver Film Critics Circle Awards 2017.

References

External links 
 

2017 films
2017 drama films
Canadian drama films
Canadian independent films
Films shot in Nova Scotia
Films set in Nova Scotia
2017 directorial debut films
English-language Canadian films
2010s Canadian films